Le Vast is a commune in the Manche department in Normandy in north-western France. The village is located in the North-East of the Cotentin Peninsula in an area known as Val de Saire, literally the Vale the River Saire.

The river used to power several mills including a cotton mill established by Philippe Fontenilliat in 1803. It employed up to 600 workers until it closed in 1858. The mill has now been replaced by the "Château de La Germonière". The grounds are open to the public on certain occasions. One of its main features is its set of two artificial waterfalls on the river which can be seen from the main road.

See also
Communes of the Manche department

References

External links
Brioche of Le Vast; history of the famous local delicacy with images

Vast